Joshua Pim and Frank Stoker defeated George Hillyard and Ernest Lewis 6–0, 7–5, 6–4 in the all comers' final to win the gentlemen's doubles tennis title at the 1890 Wimbledon Championships. The reigning champions Ernest Renshaw and William Renshaw did not defend their title.

Draw

All Comers'

References

External links

Gentlemen's Doubles
Wimbledon Championship by year – Men's doubles